Johann Jakob Meyer (December 30, 1798, in Zurich – April 11, 1826, in Missolonghi) was a Swiss editor and journalist, best remembered as a philhellene and for his research in Greek history and culture. He also published works studying sexual activity in Ancient India.

References 

1798 births
1826 deaths
Swiss editors
Swiss journalists